The blunderbuss is a firearm with a short, large caliber barrel which is flared at the muzzle and frequently throughout the entire bore, and used with shot and other projectiles of relevant quantity or caliber. The blunderbuss is commonly considered to be an early predecessor of the modern shotgun, with similar military and defensive use. It was effective only at short range, lacking accuracy at long distances. A blunderbuss in handgun form was called a dragon, and it is from this that the term dragoon evolved.

Etymology

The term "blunderbuss" is of Dutch origin, from the Dutch word donderbuis, which is a combination of donder, meaning "thunder", and buis, meaning "pipe" (Middle Dutch: busse, box, tube, from Late Latin, buxis, box, from Ancient Greek pyxίs (πυξίς).

The transition from donder to blunder is thought by some to be deliberate; the term blunder was originally used in a transitive sense, synonymous with to confuse, and this is thought to describe the stunningly loud report of the large-bore, short-barreled blunderbuss. The term dragon is taken from the fact that early versions were decorated with a carving in the form of a mythic dragon's head around the muzzle; the muzzle blast would then give the impression of a fire-breathing dragon.

Design and use

The flared muzzle is the defining feature of the blunderbuss, differentiating it from large caliber carbines; the distinction between the blunderbuss and the musketoon is less distinct, as musketoons were also used to fire shot, and some had flared barrels.

The blunderbuss could be considered an early shotgun, and served in similar roles. While various old accounts often list the blunderbuss as being loaded with various scrap iron, rocks, or wood, resulting in damage to the bore of the gun, it was typically loaded with a number of lead balls smaller than the bore diameter. Barrels were made of steel or brass.

The blunderbuss, and especially the dragon, was typically issued to troops such as cavalry, who needed a lightweight, easily handled firearm. The dragon became so associated with cavalry and mounted infantry that the term dragoon became synonymous with mounted infantry. In addition to the cavalry, the blunderbuss found a use for other duties in which the shotgun-like qualities were desirable, such as for guarding prisoners or defending a mail coach, and its use for urban combat was also recognized. Blunderbusses were also commonly carried by officers on naval warships, privateers and by pirates for use in close-quarters boarding actions. The Portuguese Marines used it widely in the 17th century. Many types of ammunition, including gravel and sand, could be shot in a pinch, but most of the time they were shot using traditional lead balls.

A typical British mail coach would have a single postal employee on board, armed with a blunderbuss and a pair of pistols, to guard the mail from highwaymen. Spring-loaded bayonet blunderbusses were also used by the Nottingham City Police after its formation around 1840.

While the blunderbuss is often associated with the Plymouth Colony Pilgrims of 1620, evidence suggests that the blunderbuss was relatively scarce in the American colonies. After the Battle of Lexington in 1775, British General Thomas Gage occupied Boston, Massachusetts, and upon negotiating with the town committee, Gage agreed to let the inhabitants of Boston leave town with their families and effects if they surrendered all arms. While most of the residents of Boston stayed, those who left under the agreement surrendered 1,778 long arms, 634 pistols, 273 bayonets, and only 38 blunderbusses. The blunderbuss did still have its civilian applications, however; the Lewis and Clark Expedition carried a number of blunderbusses, some of which were mounted and used as small swivel guns on the pirogues.

Crude tripwire activated blunderbusses, known as alarm guns, spring guns and cemetery guns, were set up in graveyards and country estates to scare away poachers and resurrection men, and alert the gamekeeper or sexton to their presence.

By the middle of the 19th century, the blunderbuss was replaced for military use by the carbine, but still found use by civilians as a defensive firearm.

See also

 Coach gun
 Combat shotgun
 Musketoon
 Riot shotgun
 Sawed-off shotgun

References

Muskets
Early firearms
18th-century weapons
19th-century weapons
Piracy
Weapons of the Netherlands